William Parker (born January 10, 1952) is an American free jazz double bassist. Beginning in the 1980s, Parker played with Cecil Taylor for over a decade, and he has led the Little Huey Creative Music Orchestra since 1981. The Village Voice named him "the most consistently brilliant free jazz bassist of all time" and DownBeat has called him "one of the most adventurous and prolific bandleaders in jazz".

Early life and career 

Parker was born in the Bronx, New York City, and grew up in the Melrose housing project. His first instrument was the trumpet, followed by the trombone and cello. Parker was not formally trained as a classical player, but in his youth studied with Jimmy Garrison, Richard Davis, and Wilbur Ware in learning the tradition.

While Parker has been active since the early 1970s, he first came to public attention playing with pianist Cecil Taylor in the 1980s. He has performed in many of Peter Brötzmann's groups, and played with saxophonist David S. Ware from 1989 until his last concert performance in 2011. He is a member of the Other Dimensions In Music cooperative. His work as leader came to greater prominence in the 1990s with groups such as the Little Huey Creative Music Orchestra and In Order to Survive.

Parker's "breakout" albums were released in the early 2000s, first with the William Parker Quartet (with saxophonist Rob Brown, drummer Hamid Drake, and trumpeter Lewis Barnes): O'Neal's Porch was included in Best of 2001 lists in The New York Times, DownBeat, and the Jazz Journalists Association; in 2002, Raining on the Moon, featuring guest Leena Conquest, received rave reviews in publications including Pitchfork. The album Sound Unity by the William Parker Quartet was chosen as one of Amazon.com's Top 100 Editor's Picks of 2005. Petit Oiseau was chosen as one of the best jazz disks of 2008 by The Wall Street Journal, the BBC's Radio Three, The Village Voice, and PopMatters. Double Sunrise Over Neptune, also released in 2008, was listed as one of the top 10 2008 (through end of August) Jazz CDs at Amazon.

Increasing prominence throughout the 2000s also led to a revisiting of his back catalogue, with the release of a number of early recordings.

Parker is a prominent musician in the New York City experimental jazz scene, where he leads a number of groups and is associated with the Vision Festival, organized by his wife, the dancer Patricia Nicholson; he is also frequently noted for his community dedication, mentorship, and status as "free-jazz caretaker" and "unofficial mayor of the New York improvisational scene".

He has performed at music festivals around the world, including the Guelph Jazz Festival in southern Ontario.

Parker frequently plays arco. Bass has been his primary instrument for the duration of his career, but he also plays trumpet, tuba, bamboo flutes, shakuhachi, flute, double reeds, the West African kora, gembri, and donso ngoni, an instrument first introduced to him by Don Cherry.

In 2006, Parker was awarded the Resounding Vision Award from Nameless Sound. In March 2007, his book, Who Owns Music?, was published by buddy's knife jazzedition in Cologne, Germany. Who Owns Music? assembles his political thoughts, poems, and musicological essays. In June 2011, Parker's second book, Conversations, a collection of interviews with notable free jazz musicians and forward thinkers, mainly from the African-American community, was published by RogueArt.

Discography

As leader

As co-leader

As sideman 

With Fred Anderson
Blue Winter (Eremite, 2005)
With Billy Bang
The Fire from Within (Soul Note, 1981)
Live at Carlos 1 (Soul Note, 1984)
With Albert Beger
Evolving Silence, Vol. 1 (2005)
Evolving Silence, Vol. 2 (2006)
With John Blum (pianist)
Astrogeny (Eremite, 2005)
With Peter Brötzmann
Never Too Late But Always Too Early (Eremite, 2003)
The Bishop's Move (Les Disques Victo, 2004)
With Peter Brötzmann Chicago Tentet
Stone/Water (Okka Disk, 2002)
Short Visit To Nowhere (Okka Disk, 2002)
Broken English (Okka Disk, 2002)
 With Brötzmann's Die Like A Dog Quartet
 Die Like a Dog: Fragments of Music, Life and Death of Albert Ayler (FMP, 1994)
 Little Birds Have Fast Hearts, No. 1 (FMP, 1998)
 Little Birds Have Fast Hearts, No. 2 (FMP, 1999)
 From Valley to Valley (Eremite, 1999)
 Aoyama Crows (FMP, 2002)
 Close Up (FMP, 2011)
With Rob Brown
Breath Rhyme (Silkheart Records, 1990)
High Wire (Soul Note, 1996)
Round the Bend (Bleu Regard, 2002)
The Big Picture (Marge, 2004)
Crown Trunk Root Funk (AUM Fidelity, 2008)
With Roy Campbell, Joe McPhee & Warren Smith
Tribute to Albert Ayler Live at the Dynamo (Marge, 2009)
With Daniel Carter and Federico Ughi
LIVE! (577 Records, 2017)
Navajo Sunrise (Rudi Records. 2013)
The Dream (577 Records, 2006)
With Bill Dixon
 Thoughts (Soul Note, 1985 [1987])
Vade Mecum (Soul Note, 1994)
Vade Mecum II (Soul Note, 1994)
With Marco Eneidi
Cherry Box (Eremite, 2000)
With Charles Gayle
Touchin' on Trane (FMP, 1991 [1993])
 Translations (Silkheart, 1993)
 Raining Fire (Silkheart, 1993)
Blue Shadows (Silkheart, 1993 [2008])
 More Live at the Knitting Factory (Knitting Factory, 1993)
Consecration (Black Saint, 1993)
Daily Bread (Black Saint, 1995)
 With Frode Gjerstad
Remember To Forget (Circulasione Totale, 1998)
Ultima (Cadence Jazz Records, 1999)
The Other Side (Ayler Records, 2006)
On Reade Street (FMR Records, 2008)
 With Alan Glover
 Kings Of Infinite Space (Omolade Music 2006)
 The Juice Quartet Archives (Omolade Music 2010)
With Wayne Horvitz
Some Order, Long Understood (Black Saint, 1982)
With Gianni Lenoci
Secret Garden (Silta)
With Frank Lowe
Black Beings (ESP-Disk', 1973)
The Loweski (ESP-Disk', 2012)
With Jimmy Lyons
Wee Sneezawee (Black Saint, 1983)
The Box Set (Ayler Records, 2003)
With Raphe Malik
Last Set: Live at the 1369 Jazz Club (Boxholder, 2004)
ConSequences (Eremite, 1999)
Companions (Eremite, 2002)
With Michael Marcus
Under The Wire (Enja, 1990)
With Thollem McDonas & Nels Cline
 The Gowanus Session (Porter, 2012)
With the Melodic Art-Tet (Charles Brackeen, Ahmed Abdullah, Parker, Roger Blank, Tony Waters)
 Melodic Art–Tet (NoBusiness, 2013)
With Roscoe Mitchell
This Dance Is for Steve McCall (Black Saint, 1993)
Nine to Get Ready (ECM, 1997)
With Jemeel Moondoc
First Feeding (Muntu, 1977)
The Evening of the Blue Men (Muntu, 1979)
Konstanze's Delight (Soul Note, 1983)
Nostalgia in Times Square (Soul Note, 1986)
New World Pygmies (Eremite, 1999)
New World Pygmies vol. 2 (Eremite, 2002)
Live at Glenn Miller Café Vol 1 (Ayler, 2002)
Live in Paris (Cadence, 2003)
With Joe Morris
Illuminate (Leo, 1995)
Elsewhere (Homestead, 1996)
Invisible Weave (No More, 1997)
Altitude (AUM Fidelity, 2012)
With Other Dimensions In Music
 Other Dimensions In Music (Silkheart, 1990)
 Now! (Aum Fidelity, 1998)
 Time Is of the Essence Is Beyond Time (Aum Fidelity, 2000)
 Live at the Sunset (Marge, 2007)
 Kaiso Stories (Silkheart, 2011)
With Ivo Perelman
Cama de Terra (Homestead, 1996)
 En Adir (Music & Arts, 1997)
 Sound Hierarchy (Music & Arts, 1997)
Serendipity (Leo, 2013)
Book of Sound (Leo, 2014)
With Hugh Ragin
 Revelation (Justin Time, 2004)
With Matthew Shipp
Points (Silkheart, 1992)
Circular Temple (Quinton, 1992)
Zo (Rise, 1994)
Critical Mass (2.13.61, 1995)
Prism (Brinkman, 1996)
The Flow of X (2.13.61, 1997)
By the Law of Music (HatART, 1997)
The Multiplication Table (hatOLOGY, 1998)
Strata (hatOLOGY, 1998)
DNA (Thirsty Ear, 1999)
Magnetism (Bleu Regard, 1999)
 Pastoral Composure (Thirsty Ear, 2000)
Expansion, Power, Release (hatOLOGY, 2001)
New Orbit (Thirsty Ear, 2001)
Equilibrium (Thirsty Ear, 2003)
Our Lady of the Flowers (RogueArt, 2015)
With Steve Swell
 Swimming in a Galaxy of Goodwill and Sorrow (RogueArt, 2007)
With Cecil Taylor
The Eighth (HatHut, 1986)
Winged Serpent (Sliding Quadrants) (Soul Note, 1987)
Olu Iwa (Soul Note, 1987)
Live in Bologna (Leo, 1987)
Live in Vienna (Leo, 1987)
Tzotzil/Mummers/Tzotzil  (Leo, 1988)
Alms/Tiergarten (Spree)  (FMP, 1988)
In Florescence  (A&M, 1989)
Looking (Berlin Version) Corona  (FMP, 1989)
Looking (Berlin Version) The Feel Trio  (FMP, 1989)
Celebrated Blazons (FMP, 1990)
2 Ts for a Lovely T,  (Codanza Records, 1990 [2002])
CT: The Dance Project (FMP, 1990 [2008])
 With David S Ware
Passage to Music (Silkheart 1988)
Great Bliss, Vol. 1 (Silkheart 1991)
Great Bliss, Vol. 2 (Silkheart 1991)
Flight of I (DIW 1992)
Third Ear Recitation (DIW 1992)
Earthquation (DIW 1994)
Cryptology (Homestead 1995)
Oblations and Blessings (Silkheart, 1996)
DAO (Homestead 1996)
Godspelized (DIW, 1996)
Wisdom of Uncertainty (AUM Fidelity, 1997)
Go See the World (Columbia, 1998)
Surrendered (Columbia, 2000)
Corridors & Parallels (AUM Fidelity, 2001)
Freedom Suite (AUM Fidelity, 2002)
Threads (Thirsty Ear, 2003)
Live in the World (Thirsty Ear, 2005)
BalladWare (Thirsty Ear, 1999 [2006])
Renunciation (AUM Fidelity, 2007)
Live in Vilnius (NoBusiness Records 2007)
Shakti (AUM Fidelity, 2009)
Onecept (AUM Fidelity, 2009)
Planetary Unknown (AUM 2010)
Live at Jazzfestival Saalfelden 2011 (AUM 2011)
Live in New York, 2010 (AUM Fidelity, 2017)

Books 
Who Owns Music? (buddy's knife jazzedition, 2007)
Conversations (RogueArt, 2010)

Films 
2001 – Inside Out in the Open (2001).  Directed by Alan Roth.  Asymmetric Pictures.  Distributed by Third World Newsreel.

References

External links 
A Sessionography
FMP releases
William Parker's book "who owns music?" at www.buddysknife.de
38 minute mp3 interview
Review of "Double Sunrise Over Neptune" (2008)
2001 interview from Vision Festival program

1952 births
Living people
American jazz double-bassists
Male double-bassists
Kora players
Avant-garde jazz double-bassists
21st-century double-bassists
21st-century American male musicians
American male jazz musicians
Other Dimensions In Music members
Thirsty Ear Recordings artists
Black Saint/Soul Note artists
AUM Fidelity artists
Intakt Records artists
RogueArt artists
NoBusiness Records artists